Nigel Lamb (born 17 August 1956) is an English aerobatics pilot and the 2014 Red Bull Air Race World Champion.

Early life 
Lamb was born in the Eastern Highlands of Southern Rhodesia and was inspired to fly by his father, a Royal Air Force fighter pilot iduringWorld War II. , and persisted until he was finally accepted at 18, in 1975, having finished his schooling at Umtali Boy's High School.

Career 
After gaining his wings he did an Operational Conversion on de Havilland Vampire jets before becoming a helicopter pilot, flying the Alouette II and Alouette III and Augusta Bell UH1-H in the Rhodesian Bush War. In 1980, following the election of Robert Mugabe, Lamb, by then an instructor, left the Air Force and moved to England to join the Marlboro Aerobatic team. He was a professional display pilot for 36 years, flew 1,900 public displays in over 30 countries worldwide including leading the first civilian aerobatics display team to fly in China in 1996. Nigel was the British Unlimited Aerobatic Champion 8 times consecutively and spent eight years putting his skills to the test in the highly challenging Red Bull Air Race World Championship, winning the 2014 world championship title.

He also featured in some major movie productions as an aerial display pilot flying a variety of historical aircraft including a Spitfire, P-51 Mustang and a P-40 Kittyhawk.

Personal life 
Nigel Lamb is married to successful aerobatic pilot Hilary, and together they have three sons, Max, Daniel and Ben. He enjoys skiing, scuba diving and squash.

2005–2010

2014-2016

See also
 Competition aerobatics

References

Footnotes

Sources

External links 
 

1956 births
Aerobatic pilots
British air racers
English aviators
Living people
Red Bull Air Race World Championship pilots
Red Bull Air Race World Championship winners
Rhodesian Air Force personnel
Rhodesian military personnel of the Bush War
White Rhodesian people
Zimbabwean people of British descent
Rhodesian aviators